Pennell may refer to:

Persons
Chris Pennell (born 1987), English rugby union player
Eagle Pennell (1952–2002), American independent filmmaker
Edward Pennell  (1894–1974), Royal Flying Corps officer
Elizabeth Robins Pennell  (1855–1936), American writer 
Francis W. Pennell (1886–1952), American botanist
Harry Pennell (1882–1916), Royal Navy Officer
Henry Singleton Pennell (1874–1907), English recipient of the Victoria Cross
Joseph Pennell (1857–1926), American artist and author
Larry Pennell (born 1928), American television and film actor
Lawrence Pennell (1914–2008), Canadian lawyer and politician
Maynard Pennell (1910–1994), American businessman
Nicholas Pennell (1938–1995), English actor
Rebecca Pennell  (1821–1890), American educator
Robert Franklin Pennell  (1850–1905), American educator and classicist
Russ Pennell (born 1960), American basketball coach
Steven Brian Pennell  (1957–1992), American serial killer
Theodore Leighton Pennell (1867–1912), Christian missionary and doctor 
Vane Pennell (1876–1938), British rackets and real tennis player

Others
20455 Pennell,  main-belt asteroid
Pennell Bank, bank on the continental shelf in the eastern Ross Sea
Pennell Coast, coast of Antarctica between Cape Williams and Cape Adare